Kenneth van Kempen (born 7 April 1987) is a Dutch retired basketball player. Standing at 2.08 m (6 ft 10 in), Van Kempen played as center. He spent four years playing college basketball with Ohio. Van Kempen also spent eight years of his career with BSW, a professional DBL club based in his hometown Weert.

Honours

Professional career

BSW
DBL All-Star (2): 2013, 2014
DBL rebounding leader (2): 2014, 2015

College career

Ohio
MAC Champion: 2010

References

External links
Profile at Eurobasket.com

1987 births
Living people
BSW (basketball club) players
Centers (basketball)
Dutch Basketball League players
Dutch expatriate basketball people in the United States
Dutch men's basketball players
Ohio Bobcats men's basketball players
Sportspeople from Weert